Joanne Yapp (born September 26, 1979) is a former English female rugby union player. She represented  at the 1998 and 2002 Women's Rugby World Cup. She captained England at the 2006 Women's Rugby World Cup.

She played in the qualifier for the 2009 Rugby World Cup Sevens. In 2011 Yapp was appointed as an athlete mentor for Sky Sports Living for Sport.

She is currently the head coach of EUWRFC, leading them to BUCS gold in 2013 at Twickenham and BUCS gold in 7s in 2014.

References

1979 births
Living people
England women's international rugby union players
English female rugby union players
Female rugby sevens players